was a province of Japan on the Inland Sea side of Honshū, in what is today the southeastern part of Okayama Prefecture. It was sometimes called , with Bitchū and Bingo Provinces. Bizen borders Mimasaka, Harima, and Bitchū Provinces.

Bizen's original center was in the modern city of Okayama. From an early time Bizen was one of Japan's main centers for sword smithing.

Historical record
In the 3rd month of the 6th year of the Wadō era (713), the land of Bizen-no kuni was administratively separated from Mimasaka Province (美作国).  In that same year, Empress Genmei's Daijō-kan continued to organize other cadastral changes in the provincial map of the Nara period.

In Wadō 6, Tanba Province (丹波国) was sundered from Tango Province (丹後国); and Hyūga Province (日向国) was divided from Ōsumi Province (大隈国).   In Wadō 5 (712), Mutsu Province (陸奥国) had been severed from Dewa Province (出羽国).

In the Muromachi period, Bizen was ruled by the Akamatsu clan from Mimasaka, but by the Sengoku period the Urakami clan had become dominant and settled in Okayama city. They were later supplanted by the Ukita clan, and Ukita Hideie was one of the regents Toyotomi Hideyoshi appointed for his son. After Kobayakawa Hideaki helped Tokugawa Ieyasu to win the Battle of Sekigahara over Ukita and others, he was granted Ukita's domains in Bizen and Mimasaka.

Bizen passed through a variety of hands during the Edo period before being incorporated into the modern prefecture system.

Shrines and temples
Kibitsuhiko jinja was the chief Shinto shrine (ichinomiya) of Bizen.

Historical districts
 Okayama Prefecture
 Akasaka District (赤坂郡) - merged with Iwanashi District to become Akaiwa District (赤磐郡) on April 1, 1900
 Iwanashi District (磐梨郡) - merged with Akasaka District to become Akaiwa District on April 1, 1900
 Jōdō District (上道郡) - dissolved
 Kojima District (児島郡) - dissolved
 Mino District (御野郡) - merged with Tsudaka District to become Mitsu District (御津郡) on April 1, 1900
 Oku District (邑久郡)
 Tsudaka District (津高郡) - merged with Mino District to become Mitsu District on April 1, 1900
 Wake District (和気郡) - Fukukawa Village became part of Akō, Hyogo Prefecture on September 1, 1963

See also 
 Okayama Domain

Notes

References
 Nussbaum, Louis-Frédéric and Käthe Roth. (2005).  Japan encyclopedia. Cambridge: Harvard University Press ;  OCLC 58053128
 Titsingh, Isaac. (1834).  Annales des empereurs du Japon (Nihon Ōdai Ichiran).  Paris: Royal Asiatic Society, Oriental Translation Fund of Great Britain and Ireland. OCLC 5850691

External links 

 "Bizen Province" at JapaneseCastleExplorer.com
  Murdoch's map of provinces, 1903

Former provinces of Japan